Walesby may refer to:
Walesby, Lincolnshire
Walesby, Nottinghamshire